Live at 25 is a live album released by the Canadian/American hard rock band Steppenwolf in 1995.

The recording of Live at 25 took place over multiple dates during the band's 1992 tour.  It was the first live album the band had released since 1981's Live in London, and the first recordings released since 1991's Born to Be Wild - A Retrospective compilation album.

Track listing
Side one
"Move Over" (John Kay, Gabriel Mekler) - 3:59
"Who Needs Ya'" (Larry Byrom, John Kay) - 3:26
"Rocket Ship" (John Kay, Michael Wilk) - 4:02
"Rock Me" (John Kay) - 3:27
"I'm Movin' On" (Hank Snow) - 3:27
 Side two
"Sookie Sookie" (Don Covay, Steve Cropper) - 3:35
"Sign on the Line" (John Kay, Michael Wilk, Rocket Ritchotte) - 5:17
"Hootchie Cootchie Man" (Willie Dixon) - 5:22
"Let's Do It All" (John Kay, Michael Wilk, Rocket Ritchotte) - 4:04
 Side three
"Hey Lawdy Mama" (John Kay, Larry Byrom, Jerry Edmonton) - 4:38
"Do or Die" (John Kay, Michael Wilk) - 4:29
"Desperation" (John Kay) - 5:41
"Hold On (Never Give up, Never Give In)" (John Kay, Michael Wilk, Rocket Ritchotte) - 6:13
Side four
"Best of What You Got" (John Kay, Michael Wilk, Rocket Ritchotte) - 5:25
"Ride With Me" (Mars Bonfire) - 4:36
"Rock N' Roll War" (John Kay, Michael Wilk, Rocket Ritchotte) - 7:47
"Snowblind Friend" (Hoyt Axton) - 4:26
 Side five
"Monster/Suicide/America" (Kay, Edmonton, St. Nicholas, Byrom) - 10:03
"Rise & Shine" (John Kay, Michael Wilk) - 4:47
"Magic Carpet Ride" (Rushton Moreve, John Kay) - 5:55
 Side six
"Born to Be Wild" (Mars Bonfire) - 7:19
"The Pusher" (Hoyt Axton) - 6:18
"Rock & Roll Rebels" (John Kay, Rocket Ritchotte, Michael Wilk) - 4:46

Personnel
John Kay - Bass, Guitar, Keyboards, Main Performer, Programming, Vocals, Producer 
Michael Wilk -	Guitar, Producer, Vocals 
Rocket Ritchotte - Guitar
Ron Hurst - Drums, Vocals

Albums produced by John Kay (musician)
Albums produced by Michael Wilk
1995 live albums
Steppenwolf (band) live albums